The Johnson House is a historic house located at 226 West Lincoln Street in Lindsborg, Kansas.

Description and history 
The brick, two-story, Second Empire style house was built from the spring to the summer of 1887, and was originally built as the residence of Dan Johnson. It sits on a plot of 0.39 acres of land. The D. Johnson house was a source of community pride and its construction seemed at times to be viewed almost as an obligation of the merchant to his community. It was added to the National Historic Register on March 19, 1998.

References

Houses completed in 1887
Houses in McPherson County, Kansas
Houses on the National Register of Historic Places in Kansas
Lindsborg, Kansas
National Register of Historic Places in McPherson County, Kansas
Second Empire architecture in the United States